This is a list of the German Media Control Top100 Singles Chart number-ones of 1996.

Number-one hits by week

See also
List of number-one hits (Germany)

Notes

References

External links
 German Singles Chart archives from 1956
 Media Control Chart Archives from 1960

Number-one hits
Germany
1996
1996